Feinstein, Finestein ("Fajnsztajn", "Fajnsztejn" in Polish spelling) or anglicized as Finestone, meaning "fine stone", that is gemstone, is a compound surname of German and Yiddish origin, similar to names like Goldstein or Rubinstein which is relatively wide spread among Ashkenazi Jews. It may refer to:

People with the name

Feinstein
 Aaron Feinstein (fl. 1903–1910), Estonian chess player
 Alan Feinstein (b. 1931), American philanthropist
 Alvan Feinstein (1925–2001), American epidemiologist
 Andrew Feinstein an ANC Member of Parliament and former African National Congress leader of South African Parliament's public accounts watchdog, Scopa
Charles Feinstein (b. 1932), British economic historian
 Daniel Isaac Feinstein (b. 1930), birth name of French artist and author Daniel Spoerri
 Dianne Feinstein (b. 1933), American politician (a senior United States senator from California and former mayor of San Francisco)
 Dovid Feinstein, American Orthodox rabbi, son of Moshe Feinstein
 Elaine Feinstein (1930–2019), British writer
 Genevieve Grotjan Feinstein (1912–2006), American cryptanalyst
 Harold Feinstein (1931–2015) American photographer
 Jeffrey Feinstein, an officer of the United States Air Force, retired
 John Feinstein, American sportswriter and commentator
 Katherine Feinstein (born 1956 or 1957), American judge 
 Meir Feinstein (:he:מאיר פיינשטיין) (1927–1947) Jewish underground fighter 
 Michael Feinstein (b. 1956), American singer and pianist
 Mike Feinstein, American Green Party politician
 Miles Feinstein (b. 1941) American criminal defense attorney and commentator
 Moshe Feinstein (1895–1986), American Orthodox rabbi
 Reuven Feinstein (b. 1937), American Orthodox Rabbi, son of Moshe Feinstein

Finestone 
 Pete Finestone (born 1964), ne Peter Finestone
 Sheila Finestone (born 1927)

Other uses
 Feinsteine, one of aggregate names of grain size (see German Korngröße article)

See also 
 Fein (disambiguation) 
 Feinberg
 Feingold
 Feinman 
 Feinmann

German-language surnames
Jewish surnames
Yiddish-language surnames

de:Feinstein